This is the discography of American rapper Lex the Hex Master from Queens, New York. As of 2020, he has released three studio albums, four extended plays, and four mixtapes.

Albums

Studio albums

Extended plays

Mixtapes

Singles

Music videos

Guest appearances

References

External links
Lex The Hex Master at Discogs

Hip hop discographies
Discographies of American artists